Villa Adelina is a city in Buenos Aires Province, Argentina. It is divided between the counties (partidos) of San Isidro and Vicente López and forms part of the urban conurbation of Greater Buenos Aires. The town is named after Adelina Munro Drysdale, whose grandfather was a British railway official in Argentina.

Education

The area once had a German school, Deutsche Schule Villa Adelina.

References

External links

 La Página de Villa Adelina - Ciudad Villa Adelina

Populated places in Buenos Aires Province
Populated places established in 1909
San Isidro Partido
Vicente López Partido
1909 establishments in Argentina
Cities in Argentina